The Ministry of Agricultural, Food and Forestry Policies,  or MiPAAF, is an Italian government department.

It was formed in 1946 as the Ministero dell'Agricoltura e delle Foreste ("Ministry of Agriculture and Forests"), and following the referendum of 1993 became the Ministero per il Coordinamento delle Politiche Agricole ("Ministry for Co-ordination of Agricultural Policies"). It was reconstituted in the same year as the Ministero delle Risorse Agricole, Alimentari e Forestali ("Ministry of Agricultural, Food and Forestry Resources") and assumed the current form in 2006, after the organisational reforms of 2005.

The Ministry, based at the Palazzo dell'Agricoltura in Rome, produces and coordinates government policy on agriculture, forests, food and fisheries at national, European and international levels.

The current Minister of Agricultural, Food and Forestry Policies is Francesco Lollobrigida.

Organisation

Ministry
Segreteria Particolare del Ministro
Servizio di Controllo Interno
Ufficio di Gabinetto
Ufficio del Portavoce del Ministro
Segreteria Tecnica del Ministro
Ufficio Legislativo
Ufficio Rapporti Internazionali
Consigliere Diplomatico
Ufficio Studi
Commissario ad Acta ex Agensud

Undersecretaries of state

Comando Carabinieri Politiche Agricole

The Comando Carabinieri Politiche Agricole is the department of the Arma dei Carabinieri which develops extraordinary controls on :
 supply and use  of subsidies in the agricultural, fisheries and aquaculture sectors;
 withdrawing and sale of food products, including helping the poor and those in developing countries

National Council on Agriculture

Dipartimento delle Filiere Agricole e Agroalimentari (Di.F.Ag.)

Direzione Generale delle Politiche Agricole (Pol.Agr.)
Pol. Agr. I - Affari Generali e Rapporti con il Dipartimento
Pol. Agr. II - Linee Generali di Politica Agricola
Pol. Agr. III - Settore del Lattiero-Caseario
Pol. Agr. IV - Settore del Vino e dei Prodotti Vitivinicoli
Pol. Agr. V - Settore dei Prodotti Ortofrutticoli e del Florovivaismo
Pol. Agr. VI - Settore dell'Olio di Oliva
Pol. Agr. VII - Settore dei Prodotti Zootecnici
Pol. Agr. VIII - Settore dei Cereali, dello Zucchero e del Tabacco
Pol. Agr. IX - Controlli FEOGA e Riconoscimento degli Organismi Pagatori

Direzione Generale della Trasformazione Agroalimentare e dei Mercati (Tr.Agr.)
Tr. Agr. I - Affari Generali e Rapporti con il Dipartimento
Tr. Agr. II - Regole di Concorrenza
Tr. Agr. III - Politiche Agroalimentari
Tr. Agr. IV - Settore Agroindustriale
Tr. Agr. V - Accordi di Filiera

Direzione Generale della Pesca Marittima e dell'Acquacoltura (Pe.M.Acq.)
Pe. M. Aqu. I - Affari Generali e Rapporti con il Dipartimento
Pe. M. Aqu. II - Rapporti Internazionali
Pe. M. Aqu. III - Conservazione Risorse Interne
Pe. M. Aqu. IV - Piano Triennale della Pesca
Pe. M. Aqu. V - Gestione ed Erogazione dei Fondi Comunitari
Pe. M. Aqu. VI - Risorse Esterne, Controllo e Vigilanza

Dipartimento delle Politiche di Sviluppo (Di.Po.S.)

Direzione Generale dello Sviluppo Rurale (Pos.R.)

Direzione Generale per la Qualità dei Prodotti Agroalimentari (Q.P.A.)

Direzione Generale per la Tutela del Consumatore (D.T.C.)

Direzione Generale dell'Amministrazione (Amm.)

Central Inspectorate for quality control on food products

Corpo Forestale dello Stato
Corpo Forestale dello Stato (CFS; Italian for State Forestry Department)

Connected bodies 
 Agenzia per le Erogazioni in Agricoltura
 Istituto Nazionale di Economia Agraria
 Unione Nazionale Incremento Razze Equine
 Istituto di Servizi per Mercato Agricolo Alimentare
 Istituto Nazionale per gli Alimenti e la Nutrizione

References

External links
Official site of the Ministero delle Politiche Agricole

Agriculture
Italy
Italy
Ministries established in 1946
Forestry in Italy
1946 establishments in Italy
Agricultural organisations based in Italy